Richard Ollard (1923–2007) was an English historian and biographer. He is best known for his work on the English Restoration period.

Life
Richard Laurence Ollard was born in Yorkshire on  9 November 1923, the son of Rev Dr S. L. Ollard, an Anglican clergyman. He was educated at Eton College where he was a King's Scholar. He joined the Navy during the Second World War and won an exhibition to New College, Oxford at its conclusion.  For twelve years from 1948 to 1959 Ollard taught history at the Royal Naval College, Greenwich in London. In 1960 he joined the publisher Collins as a senior editor, where he worked until his retirement in 1983. After his retirement from Collins he continued to research and publish widely and lived in Morecombelake, Dorset. He died of leukaemia on 21 January 2007. Richard was married to Mary (née Riddell) for 53 years & left 3 children & 5 grandchildren.

Interests and achievements
In 1992 he was awarded the Caird Medal by the Trustees of the National Maritime Museum.
In 1997 he was joint winner of the Heywood Hill Prize for a lifetime's contribution to the pleasure of reading.
Fellow of the Royal Society of Literature (FRSL)
Fellow of the Society of Antiquaries of London (FSA)
Past Vice President of the Navy Records Society
An honorary member of the Samuel Pepys Club

Selected publications
Pepys: A Biography, about Samuel Pepys
Clarendon and His Friends, about Edward Hyde, 1st Earl of Clarendon
Cromwell's Earl, a biography of Edward Montagu, 1st Earl of Sandwich
The Escape of Charles II, which combines historical rigour with a lively account of the period and the immediate aftermath of the Battle of Worcester
This War without an Enemy: A History of the English Civil Wars
The Image of the King: Charles I and Charles II
Man of War: Sir Robert Holmes and the Restoration Navy
An English Education: A perspective of Eton, about his school Eton College
Dorset, a historical guide to the county of Dorset in England
Fisher and Cunningham: A Study of the Personalities of the Churchill Era (1991)
Man of Contradictions: A Life of A. L. Rowse, Penguin (1999).

The book about Rowse sparked some controversy in literary circles. A negative review published by the London Review of Books (27 April 2000) prompted this reply by Ollard.

I am sorry that so interesting and well-written an article as Mary Beard's should convey so bitterly one-sided an impression of my book on A.L. Rowse. His encouragement of fellow writers, his practical kindness and hospitality towards them, certainly bulked larger in my mind when I was writing it than the splenetic egocentricity that led him into all too well publicised excesses.

It is humiliating for any author to have failed so signally in what he set out to do. I am reminded of Congreve's witticism that bad portraitists are obliged to write the name of their sitters at the bottom. So may I, likewise, ask LRB readers to accept that my view of Rowse is emphatically not that presented by Mary Beard.

Richard Ollard

External links
Richard Ollard's page at Penguin Books
Richard Ollard's page at Orion Books
LRB Letters page, May 2000
Guardian obituary https://www.theguardian.com/news/2007/feb/07/guardianobituaries.obituaries1

References

Obituary, The Times, 26 January 2007

1923 births
People educated at Eton College
Alumni of New College, Oxford
Academics of the Royal Naval College, Greenwich
Fellows of the Society of Antiquaries of London
Fellows of the Royal Society of Literature
English biographers
2007 deaths
20th-century biographers